Malporus is a genus of antlike flower beetles in the family Anthicidae. There are at least four described species in Malporus.

Species
These four species belong to the genus Malporus:
 Malporus cinctus (Say, 1824)
 Malporus formicarius (LaFerté-Sénectère, 1849)
 Malporus properus Casey, 1895
 Malporus werneri Chandler, 1997

References

Further reading

External links

 

Anthicidae
Articles created by Qbugbot